"I'm Coming Home" is a song recorded by Japanese-American singer-songwriter Ai, released on January 14, 2020, by EMI Records. Written by Ruri Matsumura, Ai and Jin, the song served as the theme song for the sci-fi thriller AI Hokai.

Background and release 
In October 2019, it was revealed Ai would sing the theme song for AI Amok, a Japanese sci-fi thriller film directed by Yu Ire. Ai was asked by Ire to record a song for his film as he wanted a female artist to sing the theme song. Regarding the film being about artificial intelligence and the irony of recruiting Ai to record a song for the film, Ire stated, “People asked me if I was joking at first, but she wrote a great song”. Ire also stated he "absolutely needed Ai's loving and powerful singing". In a 2020 interview regarding her 2020 extended play It's All Me, Vol. 1, Ai talked about "I'm Coming Home", commenting, "The movie was about artificial intelligence, but I wanted to make the theme song human-like".

In June 2020, "I'm Coming Home" was revealed to be included on Ai's EP, It's All Me, Vol. 1 serving as the third single.

Music and lyrics 
Billboard described "I'm Coming Home" as a "warm, inspirational ballad that sings about having a place to come home to".

Music video 
A music video was released on the same day of the songs release. The music video focuses on the real lives of three different families, similar to a documentary. Scenes where Ai is singing by the sea were shot at Tojo beach in Kamogawa in the Chiba Prefecture, where a scene from the film was recorded. The music video was directed by Ire.

Live performances 
Ai performed the song during TBS' Count Down TV broadcast.

Track listing 
Digital download and streaming

 "I'm Coming Home"  — 5:04

Personnel 
Credits adapted from Tidal.

 Ai Uemura – songwriting, lead vocals, production
 Ruri Matsumura – songwriting
 Jin – production, songwriting, arrangement
 Futoshi Kawashima – arrangement

Release history

Notes

References 

2020 songs
2020 singles
2020s ballads
Songs written for films
Ai (singer) songs
Songs written by Ai (singer)
EMI Records singles
Universal Music Japan singles
Song recordings produced by Ai (singer)